Anthony Leguinn McDowell is a former professional American football player who played running back for three seasons for the Tampa Bay Buccaneers.

He was featured on Season 11, Episode 5 of Undercover Boss.  He works as a manager of a Round Table Pizza franchise in Dallas, Texas.

References

1968 births
Living people
American football running backs
Tampa Bay Buccaneers players
Texas Tech Red Raiders football players